A precerebral artery is an artery leading to the cerebrum, but not in the cerebrum.

In the human they are:
 Vertebral artery
 Basilar artery
 Common carotid artery
 Internal carotid artery

References

Arteries of the head and neck